Chermizy-Ailles is a commune in the Aisne department in Hauts-de-France in northern France.

Geography
The river Ailette flows west through the commune, then flows into the lac de l'Ailette, which forms part of the commune's western border.

Population

See also
Communes of the Aisne department

References

Chermizyailles
Aisne communes articles needing translation from French Wikipedia